All the Pretty Horses may refer to:

 All the Pretty Horses (novel), a 1992 novel by Cormac McCarthy
 All the Pretty Horses (film), a 2000 film based on the novel
 "All the Pretty Little Horses" (also known as "Hush-a-bye"), a traditional lullaby from the Southern United States

See also 
 All the Pretty Little Horses (album), a 1996 album by English band Current 93